Bruno Ruzza (10 February 1926, in Padua – 13 September 2019, in Padua) was an Italian former footballer who played as a defender.

Career 

He started playing as a forward with Padova Calcio in the Campionato Alta Italia 1943-44. With Treviso Calcio and Padova Calcio he played six seasons in Serie B.

In 1953 he was banned from competitions due to possible corruption in the match Padova-Calcio Catania. He then joined Padova again till his last season 1956–1957.

References 

Sportspeople from Padua
1926 births
2019 deaths
Italian footballers
Calcio Padova players
Association football defenders
Footballers from Veneto